"Napoleon" is the second single by Peter Wolfe. Unlike "For Lovers" the ratings for "Napoleon" weren't all that positive. Especially Wolfman's singing was in the center of negative criticism and was described as "mo-no-tone ratatat". The single reached number forty-four in the UK Singles Chart.

Track listing

CD 
 "Napoleon"
 "From The Darkness" 
 "Napoleon" (Radio Edit)

7" 
 "Napoleon"
 "From The Darkness"

References

2004 singles
2004 songs
Songs written by Peter Wolfe (musician)